Orthaga melanoperalis is a species of snout moth in the genus Orthaga. It is found on Borneo.

References

Moths described in 1906
Epipaschiinae